Ramona's World is the eighth book in the Ramona Quimby series by Beverly Cleary. Ramona and her sister Beezus are growing up.  Ramona is in the fourth grade now, and for the first time she has a best girl-friend, Daisy Kidd. At home she tries her best to be a good role model for her baby sister Roberta, but finds baby sitting harder than she expected. Published in 1999, Ramona's World was written fifteen years after its predecessor, Ramona Forever. It was the last published installment in the series, as well as the last book Cleary published before her retirement and her death on March 25, 2021.

Plot
Ramona's world is changing. There's tiny baby Roberta at home, and as Ramona adjusts to being a big sister, she discovers that she likes teaching Roberta to do things such as sticking out her tongue. In fourth grade, she finally has a best friend, the new student Daisy Kidd (who is also new to the neighborhood). At school Ramona is frustrated with her teacher, Mrs. Meacham. Mrs. Meacham pushes her students to be proper spellers; spelling is a difficult subject for Ramona. Mrs. Meacham also intercepts a note that Ramona's friend Yard Ape wrote to Ramona; after that, Yard Ape is too embarrassed to play with her or even talk to her.

Beezus, a 14-year-old just entering high school, starts speaking French around the house, spending a lot of time on the phone talking about boys and asking her friends about who she should date, which makes her little sister mad. Ramona begins to feel forgotten as Beezus, while Mr. and Mrs. Quimby are always fussing over Roberta.

Beezus, in an act of rebellion, gets her ears pierced; her parents are amused and pleased that she is growing up. Beezus nervously attends a party at which boys were invited — as it turns out, the boys stayed outside the house the entire time and the girls played inside and everyone was happy.

Ramona and Daisy's dress-up play at Daisy's house ends in disaster when Ramona falls through the unfinished floor in the attic, dangling into the kitchen until Daisy's older brother Jeremy helps fish her out. Ramona is shocked that Daisy takes responsibility and Daisy's mother isn't upset. Later, she cares for the Kidds' cat when they go away on vacation for a week and she discovers that the responsibility of catsitting isn't as easy as it looks.

Ramona's rivalry with Susan, her nemesis since kindergarten, continues. Ramona is frustrated by Susan's perfect attitude. She reluctantly invites Susan to her "zeroteen" birthday party at the park at her mother's insistence. Susan brings an apple instead of eating the birthday cake, because of her mother's cautions about germs. After  the other girls tease her and Mrs. Quimby comforts her, she finally decides to eat a slice of cake. Ramona discovers she feels sorry for Susan, whose mother expects her to always be perfect. Ramona gives the leftover cake to Yard Ape and his friends, who were also playing at the park, and she decides this is a perfect day - well, not perfect, but close enough.

Characters

The following characters appear in the novel:

 Ramona Quimby, Beezus and Roberta's 9-year-old sister, and protagonist of the story
 Beatrice "Beezus" Quimby,  Ramona and Roberta's 14-year-old sister
 Dorothy Quimby, Ramona's mother
 Robert Quimby, Ramona's father
 Daisy Kidd, a girl who is new to the neighborhood, who soon becomes Ramona's best friend
 Jeremy Kidd, Daisy's older brother; he and Beezus seem to like one another
 Howard "Howie" Kemp, Ramona's childhood-friend-turned-cousin-in-law, thanks to the marriage of his uncle and her aunt
 Danny (no last name given) (nicknamed "Yard Ape"), Ramona's "friend"
 Roberta Day Quimby, Beezus and Ramona's baby sister
 Mrs. Meacham, Ramona's fourth grade teacher.
 Susan Kushner, Ramona's rival since kindergarten, though her mother frequently encourages Ramona to be nice to her.

Critical reaction

Reviewers' reactions to Cleary's books continues to be positive, as seen in Kirkus Reviews: "Ramona returns, and she’s as feisty as ever…  Cleary picks up on all the details of fourth grade, from comparing hand calluses to the distribution of little plastic combs by the school photographer. This year Ramona is trying to improve her spelling, and Cleary is especially deft at limning the emotional nuances as Ramona fails and succeeds, goes from sad to happy, and from hurt to proud… Despite a brief mention of nose piercing, Cleary’s writing still reflects a secure middle-class family and untroubled school life, untouched by the classroom violence or the broken families of the 1990s. While her book doesn’t match what’s in the newspapers, it’s a timeless, serene alternative for children..."

Last book of the series
Ramona's World is Beverly Cleary's last published book. Ramona remains frozen at age 10, while her sister, Beezus, is 14 and just entering high school. Concerning what Ramona might have been like when she hit puberty, Cleary was happy to leave her as is before her puberty stage, which she considers a nightmare. “I think writers need to know when to retire,” she said.

In a 1995 interview, Cleary believes that Ramona will “be all right” when she grows up. "She'll do something creative. She liked to draw because her father liked to draw. Children often live out their parents' frustrations.”

Editions

Audio Formats: Ramona's World is available in cassette, CD and eAudiobook from Random House/Listening Library;
Print/English: Braille available from Morrow Junior Books, e-Book through HarperCollins;
Print/Worldwide: As of 2010, 53 editions of Ramona's World had been published in 7 languages.

References

External links
 The World of Beverly Cleary

1999 American novels
American children's novels
Novels by Beverly Cleary
Novels set in Portland, Oregon
1999 children's books